East 233rd Street is a major thoroughfare in the New York City borough of The Bronx. The road changes names from East 233rd Street to Pinkley Avenue after the eastern terminus, at Boston Road. There is one interchange with a highway along the way, which is for the Bronx River Parkway.

Street description

East 233rd Street begins at an interchange with Jerome Avenue and Interstate 87, the Major Deegan Expressway, in Van Cortlandt Park. The road serves as the northern border of Woodlawn Cemetery until its intersection with Webster Avenue, where it meets Metro-North's Harlem Line at the Woodlawn station. Webster Avenue also serves as the access point to and from the southbound side of the Bronx River Parkway, though the Parkway signs this exit for "East 233rd Street." Access for the northbound side of the Parkway is provided by Bronx Boulevard. One block east at Carpenter Avenue, the road passes by Our Lady of Mercy Medical Center on the south side.

At an interchange with White Plains Road, the road passes by the subway station that serves the  trains. Now in the neighborhood of Edenwald, the road intersects Baychester Avenue (the former routing of Route 164) at the northwest corner of Seton Falls Park. In the neighborhood of Eastchester, the road passes by the second subway station, which serves the  train. A few blocks to the east, the road intersects Provost Avenue, which carries Route 22. The road then narrows down from four lanes to two lanes, and terminates at a partial interchange with Boston Road, which carries U.S. 1. However, access is only provided to U.S. 1 south via service roads. From here, the road continues south for two additional blocks known as Pinkley Avenue.

History
Originally, between its western end and Webster Avenue, East 233rd Street was known as Eastchester Street. It was known as 19th Avenue within Wakefield, where it served as the southern border of Jacksonville. In Eastchester, the street was called Fisher's Landing Road, running to the Hutchinson River to the site of land owned by William Fisher.

Between Webster and Provost Avenues, East 233rd Street was once part of NY 22, which previously continued into Manhattan. The road was also part of the alignment for the proposed City Line Expressway.

Transportation

There are two New York City Subway stations along East 233rd Street. The first one, 233rd Street, is located at the intersection of 233rd and White Plains Road. The second one, Eastchester–Dyre Avenue, is located at the Dyre Avenue intersection with Eastchester. There is access to the Bx16, Bx31 and Bx34 buses provided by the Metropolitan Transportation Authority on East 233rd Street.

Major intersections

References

External links 

Streets in the Bronx